This the production discography by R. Kelly. Records that are produced by R. Kelly for himself or him as a featuring artist are not included in this list.

Albums produced

Studio albums

Soundtrack albums

Singles produced

1990s

2000s

2010s

A.  Charted only on the Hot R&B/Hip-Hop Airplay chart.

1991

David Peaston - Mixed Emotions
06. I
08. String
09. Everybody Needs Somebody

Vickie Winans - The Lady
10. Don't Throw Your Life Away (Remix)

1992

Hi-Five - Keep It Goin' On
02. Quality Time
05. A Little Bit Older Now
07. Let's Get It Started (Keep It Goin' On)
08. Video Girl

1993

Billy Ocean - Time to Move On
08. Rose
09. Can We Go 'Round Again
10. Everything's So Different Without You

The Winans - All Out
01. Payday
04. That Extra Mile

1994

Aaliyah - Age Ain't Nothing But A Number
01. Intro
02. Throw Your Hands Up
03. Back & Forth
04. Age Ain't Nothing But a Number
05. Down with the Clique
06. At Your Best (You Are Love)
07. No One Knows How to Love Me Quite Like You Do
08. I'm So Into You
09. Street Thing
10. Young Nation
11. Old School
12. I'm Down¨
13. The Thing I Like
14. Back & Forth (Remix)
Also produced At Your Best (You Are Love) (Remix), not included on the album.

Changing Faces - Changing Faces
01. Stroke You Up
02. Foolin' Around
13. All Is Not Gone

Ex-Girlfriend - It's A Woman Thang
03. You for Me

A Low Down Dirty Shame
04. R. Kelly - Homie, Lover, Friend (Lookin' For My Homie Mix)
06. Changing Faces - Stroke You Up (Remix)
07. Aaliyah - The Thing I Like

Janet Jackson - janet. Remixed
11. Any Time, Any Place (R. Kelly Mix)

N-Phase - N-Phase
02. Spend The Night

Toni Braxton - How Many Ways 
04. How Many Ways (Remix)

Gerald Levert - Can't Help Myself
01. Can't Help Myself (R. Kelly radio remix)

1995

Quincy Jones - Q's Jook Joint
11. Heavens Girl

Michael Jackson - HIStory
09. You Are Not Alone

Michael Jackson - You Are Not Alone
02. You Are Not Alone (R. Kelly Remix)

1996

The Isley Brothers - Mission to Please
03. Let's Lay Together
05. Can I Have A Kiss (For Old Time's Sake)?
06. Mission To Please You

Johnny Gill - Let's Get the Mood Right
09. Someone To Love

MC Lyte - Bad As I Wanna B
10. Two Seater

A Thin Line Between Love and Hate
04. R. Kelly - Freak Tonight

Toni Braxton - Secrets
10. I Don't Want To

1997

Changing Faces - All Day, All Night
 02. G.H.E.T.T.O.U.T.
 07. All Of My Days
 08. All Day, All Night
 09. G.H.E.T.T.O.U.T. (Pt. 2)

Mary J. Blige - Share My World
08. It's On

Various Artists - Diana, Princess of Wales: Tribute
17. Every Nation (by Red Hot R&B All-Stars) (features: Jane Binning, Magdalena Grubski, Anica Boulanger Mashberg, Jemma Gates, Jane Russell Taylor, Jane Polley, Sara Cooper, Astrid Wells Cooper, Les Winspear, and Nick Storr)

Vanessa Williams - Next
10. Start Again

1998

Celine Dion - These Are Special Times
14. I'm Your Angel (Duet With R. Kelly)

Luther Vandross - One Night with You: The Best of Love, Volume 2
02. When You Call On Me

Sparkle - Sparkle
01. Good Life
02. Time To Move On
03. Lean On Me
04. I'm Gone
05. Turn Away
06. What About
07. Be Careful
08. Nothing Can Compare
09. Quiet Place
10. Lovin' You
11. Straight Up
12. Vegas
13. No Greater
14. Play On
15. Plenty Good Lovin'

Trin-I-Tee 5:7 - Trin-I-Tee 5:7
02. God's Grace

Belly: Original Soundtrack
01. Lady - No Way In, No Way Out

Gerald Levert - Love & Consequences
09. Men Like Us

1999

Blaque - Blaque
 06. 808

Life: Music Inspired By The Motion Picture
02. It's Like Everyday
03. Stimulate Me
04. Fortunate
05. Lovin' You
06. Every Which Way
07. It's Gonna Rain
08. Discovery
09. Follow The Wind
10. Why Should I Believe You
13. Speechless
14. Life

Trin-I-Tee 5:7 - Spiritual Love
08. There He Is

Wild Wild West: Music Inspired By the Motion Picture
08. Mailman (Faith Evans)

2000

Changing Faces - Visit Me
01. Visit Me

Kelly Price - Mirror Mirror
04. At Least (The Little Things)

2001

112 - Part III
14. Do What You Gotta Do

The Fast and the Furious
06. R. Kelly - Take My Time Tonight

Michael Jackson - Invincible
07. Cry

Nivea - Nivea
02. Ya Ya Ya (feat. Lil' Wayne & R. Kelly)
04. The One for Me
05. Laundromat (feat. R. Kelly)

Syleena Johnson - Chapter 1: Love, Pain & Forgiveness
02. I Am Your Woman

The Isley Brothers - Eternal
02. Contagious

2002

Blaque - Blaque Out
14. She Ain't Got That Boom (808 Remix)

B2K - Pandemonium!
02. Bump, Bump, Bump
03. Girlfriend
06. Bump That
08. What A Girl Wants

Syleena Johnson - Chapter 2: The Voice
05. Guess What
15. Tonight I'm Gonna Let Go (Remix)
16. Joined at the Hip

Truth Hurts - Truthfully Speaking
11. The Truth

2003

ATL - The ATL Project
02. Calling All Girls

ATL - Calling All Girls (Vinyl)
03. Calling All Girls (Part 2)

B2K - Greatest Hits
03. Girlfriend (Pied Piper Remix)

Big Tymers - Big Money Heavyweight
03. Gangsta Girl

Boo & Gotti - Perfect Timing
06. Dear Ghetto

Britney Spears - In The Zone
07. Outrageous

Nick Cannon - Nick Cannon
02. Feelin' Freaky feat. B2K
03. Gigolo
05. You

Ginuwine - The Senior
04. Hell Yeah
15. Hell Yeah (Remix)

The Isley Brothers - Body Kiss
01. Superstar
02. Lucky Charm
03. What Would You Do?
04. Body Kiss
05. Busted
06. Showdown Vol. 1
07. Keep It Flowin'
08. Prize Possession
09. Take a Ride
11. I Like
12. What Would You Do? Pt. 2

JS - Ice Cream
01. Love Angel
03. Ice Cream
04. Bye-Bye
05. Slow Grind
06. Half
07. Ice Cream (Remix)
12. Stay Right Here
14. Sister

Michael Jackson - Number Ones
17. One More Chance

Michael Jackson - One More Chance (US Promo 12 Inch Disc Vinyl Single)
02. One More Chance (R. Kelly Remix)

Joe - And Then...
03. More & More
08. Make You My Baby

Russell - When I'm With You
02. Rich Man

Syleena Johnson - Chapter 2: The Voice
01. Guess What (Guess Again) (Remix)

Tyrese - 2 Fast 2 Furious
05. Pick Up The Phone

2004

Britney Spears - Greatest Hits: My Prerogative
14. Outrageous (R. Kelly Remix)

Jennifer Lopez - The Reel Me
06. Baby I Love U! (R. Kelly Remix)

Marques Houston - MH
02. Clubbin'
16. That Girl (Remix)
17. Clubbin' (Remix)

Ciara - Goodies
09. Next To You

Tamia - More
05. Questions

Tony Sunshine - Unreleased
00. Everywhere I Go

Twista - Kamikaze
10. So Sexy
17. So Sexy: Chapter II (Like This)

2005

Do or Die - D.O.D.
08. Magic Chick

Nivea - Complicated
11. Gangsta Girl

Ray J - Raydiation
09. Quit Actin'

Syleena Johnson - Chapter 3: The Flesh
02. Hypnotic
04. Special Occasion

Charlie Wilson - Charlie, Last Name Wilson
01. Magic
02. Charlie, Last Name Wilson
05. No Words

2006

Ruben Studdard - I Need An Angel
01. I Need An Angel

Sharissa - Every Beat Of My Heart
04. In Love Wit A Thug (Feat. R. Kelly)

The Isley Brothers - Baby Makin' Music
02. Blast Off

Tyrese - Alter Ego
08. Hurry Up
09. Signs Of Love Makin', Pt. 2

2007

Trey Songz - Trey Day
08. Grub On

Jaheim - The Makings of a Man
02. Hush

Twista - Adrenaline Rush 2007
09. Love Rehab

Tyler Perry's Daddy's Little Girls
02. R. Kelly - Don't Let Go

Trin-i-tee 5:7 - T57
10. U Saved Me

2008

Frankie J - TBA
00. Dancin'

James Andrew
00. Welcome To My World
00. Savannah Chocolate
00. It's R&B (feat. R. Kelly)

Pussycat Dolls - Doll Domination
06. Out of This Club (feat. R. Kelly & Polow da Don)

2009

Whitney Houston - I Look to You 
04. I Look to You
11. Salute

2011

Jennifer Hudson - I Remember Me 
03. Where You At

K. Michelle - Pain Medicine (Unreleased) 
00. I Just Can't Do This
00. Sweetest Love
00. Ghost
00. Baby You

Tyrese - Open Invitation 
13. Angel (vocal production)

2012

Sparkle: Music from the Motion Picture 
06. Something He Can Feel (Carmen Ejogo, Jordin Sparks and Tika Sumpter)
07. His Eye Is on the Sparrow (Whitney Houston)
09. One Wing (Jordin Sparks)
10. Love Will (Jordin Sparks)
11. Celebrate (Whitney Houston & Jordin Sparks)

Whitney Houston - I Will Always Love You: The Best of Whitney Houston 
17. I Look to You (Whitney Houston & R. Kelly)

2013

Lady Gaga - ARTPOP 
07. Do What U Want

2015

Bryson Tiller - T R A P S O U L 
02. Let Em' Know

2016

Fantasia Barrino - The Definition Of... 
05. Sleeping with the One I Love

2017

Fally Ipupa - Tokooos 
16. Nidja

Marvin Sapp - Close 
03. Listen

K. Michelle - Kimberly: The People I Used to Know 
07. Takes Two (featuring Jeremih)

2018

Mýa - TKO (The Knock Out) 
07. Ready (Part III - 90's Bedroom Mix)

2020

A Boogie wit da Hoodie - Artist 2.0 
08. DTB 4 Life (Sample: One Wish)

Teyana Taylor - The Album 
08. Boomin (featuring Future & Missy Elliott) (Sample: 808)

References

R. Kelly
Pop music discographies
Rhythm and blues discographies
Discographies of American artists
Hip hop discographies
Production Discography
Soul music discographies